Paradiarsia coturnicola is a moth of the family Noctuidae. It is found in the South Siberian Mountains, central Yakutia, the mountains of north-eastern Siberia, and the area of Russia north of the Russian Far East.

External links
 Noctuinae 

Noctuinae
Moths described in 1892